Once Upon a Tune is a weekly half-hour American television series that aired on the DuMont Television Network, premiering on March 6, 1951, and running to May 15, 1951.

The series presented original musical productions which were often satirical and tongue-in-cheek adaptations of either classic fairy tales or contemporary Broadway musicals. Bea Arthur made her TV debut on this series.

Episode status
The Paley Center for Media holds kinescope copies of three episodes – one spoofing "Three Little Pigs", one spoofing "Rapunzel", and the third on a 57-minute kinescope film reel. (This latter reel also contains an episode of Mr. Dynamite, a TV series or pilot based on an earlier Hollywood movie of the same name based on a Dashiell Hammett story.)

According to Edie Adams, an actress who worked at DuMont for several years, much of the network's programming archive was destroyed in the 1970s.

See also
List of programs broadcast by the DuMont Television Network
List of surviving DuMont Television Network broadcasts

References

Bibliography
David Weinstein, The Forgotten Network: DuMont and the Birth of American Television (Philadelphia: Temple University Press, 2004) 
Alex McNeil, Total Television, Fourth edition (New York: Penguin Books, 1980) 
Tim Brooks and Earle Marsh, The Complete Directory to Prime Time Network TV Shows, Third edition (New York: Ballantine Books, 1964)

External links
 Once Upon a Tune at IMDB
 DuMont historical website

American musical television series
DuMont Television Network original programming
1950s American satirical television series
1951 American television series debuts
1951 American television series endings
Black-and-white American television shows